Happy Day is a live album by British worship leader Tim Hughes. In September 2008, Hughes attended Shepherd's Bush Empire in London, England, to record a live concert album and DVD. 2,000 fans attended the event. The album was released on 14 March 2009, to many positive reviews. British guitarist Stu G of Delirious? also performed at the event, and a duet of 'Here I Am To Worship' was performed with Martin Smith. Rap act 29th Chapter also dueted with Hughes on the song 'Dance'.

Track listing

References

Tim Hughes albums
2009 live albums